Neil Jablonski (born 9 March 1983) is a retired Scottish footballer who played as a midfielder.

Career
Jablonski began his career with Dundee, making his debut in August 2002 as a substitute, aged 19. Featuring once more in the 2002–03 season, he played in the opening day win the following season but then moved on loan to Brechin City for four months. At Brechin he scored his first career goal in a game against Clyde. He returned to Dundee in January 2004 and played around a dozen games throughout the rest of that season. A fractured wrist in September 2004 ruled him out for six weeks, although he returned in mid October as a late substitute. Two further games followed in the remainder of 2004 before a January 2005 move to Gretna seemed likely; in fact, he joined Raith Rovers instead on a free transfer. Featuring in twelve games in the remainder of the season, Jablonski stayed with Raith as they were relegated to the Second Division, featuring regularly in the 2005-06 season as they failed to gain promotion at the first attempt. In May 2006, Jablonski dropped down to the Third Division with East Fife, featuring prominently in the first few months. After seeming set to leave the club in January 2007 to go travelling in Australia, Jablonski committed himself for the remainder of the season, going on to score ten goals and being nominated for Third Division Player of the Year.

As expected, Jablonksi left East Fife at the end of the season and spent the summer months doing coaching work in the United States before heading to Australia, joining New South Wales side Sutherland Sharks. A year later, in late October 2008, Jablonski returned temporarily to Scotland, signing for hometown junior club Glenrothes, spending three months with the Fife side before returning to Australia in January 2009. Jablonksi combines playing duties with working for Mark Robertson's Soccer Skills Coaching Academy. He is currently the captain of newly promoted NSW PL1 side Hakoah Sydney City East FC.

Statistics
Correct to 1 July 2007:

Honours

Sutherland Sharks
NSW Premier Championship: 1
 2008

References

External links
 

1983 births
Living people
Scottish footballers
Dundee F.C. players
Brechin City F.C. players
Raith Rovers F.C. players
East Fife F.C. players
Scottish Premier League players
Scottish Football League players
People from Glenrothes
Association football midfielders
Expatriate soccer players in Australia
Sutherland Sharks FC players
Scottish expatriate footballers
Footballers from Fife
Scottish expatriate sportspeople in Australia
Scottish Junior Football Association players
Glenrothes F.C. players